Louis Robert Gigante (March 19, 1932October 19, 2022) was an American priest of the Catholic Church and a Bronx community activist, serving as one of the borough's New York City Council members.  He founded the South East Bronx Community Organization (SEBCO).

Early life
Gigante was born in Manhattan on March 19, 1932.  His father, Salvatore, was employed as a watchmaker; his mother, Yolanda (Santasilia), worked as a seamstress.  Both immigrated to the United States from Naples and did not speak English.  He was the brother of two Genovese crime family members, family boss Vincent "The Chin" Gigante and top capo/acting boss Mario Gigante.  Gigante was raised in Greenwich Village and attended Cardinal Hayes High School in the Bronx.  He played for its basketball team that won the Catholic schools city championship in 1949, before graduating the following year.  He was awarded an athletic scholarship by Georgetown University, where he was a guard and co-captain of the Georgetown Hoyas.  After graduating in 1954, he attended St. Joseph's Seminary and College and was ordained to the Catholic priesthood in 1959.

Presbyteral ministry
As a Catholic priest at St. Athanasius Church in the South Bronx neighborhood of Longwood, Gigante was one of the leading proponents of tenant rights reform in the late 1960s.  As the parish priest, members of his congregation included future U.S. Supreme Court Associate Justice Sonia Sotomayor when she was a teenager. In the fall of 1968, he founded the South East Bronx Community Organization (SEBCO), with funds from the federal Section 8 housing program, through which tenants pay 30 percent of their income in rent and the federal government pays the difference. SEBCO was generally considered to be one of the organizations most responsible for the economic and civic rehabilitation of the depressed South Bronx area. Gigante ran unsuccessfully for Congress in 1970.  By 1981, he had orchestrated the construction and rehabilitation of 1,100 federally subsidized apartments in the Hunts Point section of the South Bronx. He claimed credit for the rejuvenation of the Bronx, saying "I brought the neighborhood up from ashes to help the people in the South Bronx. There isn't one other organization that can take credit." 

Later investigation revealed that SEBCO and other construction projects in the Bronx enriched both Gigante – who died with at least three homes and a $7 million fortune – and members of the Genovese crime syndicate, including Gigante's brothers. Other accusations range from Gigante being a slumlord to him being too old to manage such a large project.

Political career
In November 1973, Gigante was elected to the New York City Council and represented the 8th City Council district until 1977, when he opted not to run for re-election.

Later life
On July 30, 2021, it was reported that Gigante sexually abused a nine-year-old boy on multiple occasions during the mid-1970s while working at St. Athanasius Church.  Another lawsuit filed the same year alleged that he sexually assaulted a girl in the early 1960s.  Both cases were at the New York Supreme Court (the state's trial court) and not yet decided at the time of his death.

Gigante died on October 19, 2022, at age 90.

Personal life
After he died, his will revealed he was a multimillionaire with a fortune of $7 million and he left nearly all his fortune to a single beneficiary, to the son he had while he was a priest, Gino Gigante.

Notes

Further reading 
 Jonnes, Jill. South Bronx Rising: The Rise, Fall, and Resurrection of an American City. New York: Fordham University Press, 2002. .

External links 
 "Murphy's Flaw" City Limits, February 1997.

1932 births
2022 deaths
American people of Italian descent
American Roman Catholic priests
Genovese crime family
Politicians from the Bronx
New York City Council members
People of the Roman Catholic Archdiocese of New York
New York (state) Democrats